The Pampanga Hotel is a heritage house in the City of San Fernando, Pampanga in the Philippines. 

The building was originally the residence of Asuncion Santos, a daughter of Don Teodoro Santos, Sr. (Dorong Tola), who married Andres Eusebio.  It later became the first site of the Pampanga High School. The building later became the site of the Harvardian College, then the Pampanga Hotel and Panciteria,.  It is now the Pampanga Lodge and Restaurant.

Buildings and structures in San Fernando, Pampanga
Cultural Properties of the Philippines
Landmarks in the Philippines
Heritage Houses in the Philippines
Heritage hotels